5201 Ferraz-Mello is an asteroid from the asteroid belt, discovered on 1 December 1983 by Ted Bowell at the Anderson Mesa Station of the Lowell Observatory. It is one of very few Hecuba-gap asteroids located in the 2:1 mean motion resonance with Jupiter.

References

External links
 
 

005201
Discoveries by Edward L. G. Bowell
Named minor planets
19831201